The Blakely Court Square Historic District is a  historic district in Blakely in Early County, Georgia which was listed on the National Register of Historic Places in 2002.

The district is centered on the Early County Courthouse and is bounded by Powell St., Smith Ave., and Church and Bay Sts.  It included 72 contributing buildings, two contributing structures, and two contributing objects.  It also included 21 non-contributing buildings and one non-contributing object.

It was deemed significant in the areas of architecture, community planning and development, politics/government and commerce.  Its architectural landmarks include:
Early County Courthouse (1905), neo-Classical
United States Post Office (1937), Stripped Classical
Blakely City Hall and Fire Department (1939), the Colonial Revival-style 
Early County Jail (1940), Art Deco 
two churches in Gothic Revival-style.

References

External links

Historic districts on the National Register of Historic Places in Georgia (U.S. state)
Victorian architecture in Georgia (U.S. state)
Buildings and structures completed in 1826
Early County, Georgia